Daniel Ngoru  was an Anglican bishop in Kenya: he was Bishop of Kirinyaga from 1997 to 2012.

References

20th-century Anglican bishops of the Anglican Church of Kenya
21st-century Anglican bishops of the Anglican Church of Kenya
Anglican bishops of Kirinyaga